Colum Halpenny (born April 25, 1979) is a former professional rugby league footballer who played in the 2000s.

References

1979 births
Living people
Australian rugby league players
Australian expatriate sportspeople in England
Halifax R.L.F.C. players
Place of birth missing (living people)
Rugby league centres
Rugby league fullbacks
Rugby league wingers
Wakefield Trinity players